Mishap Creek is a stream in Aleutians East Borough, Alaska, in the United States.

Mishap Creek was named from an incident when a lightkeeper threw his dry clothes across the creek while crossing it, missed the bank, and lost his clothing to the current.

See also
List of rivers of Alaska

References

Rivers of Aleutians East Borough, Alaska
Rivers of Alaska